Thyrocopa kanaloa is a moth of the family Xyloryctidae. It was first described by Matthew J. Medeiros in 2009. It is endemic to Kahoolawe.

External links

Thyrocopa
Endemic moths of Hawaii
Moths described in 2009